The 2016–17 East of Scotland Football League (known for sponsorship reasons as the Central Taxis East of Scotland League) was the 88th season of the East of Scotland Football League, and the 3rd season as the sixth tier of the Scottish football pyramid system. The season began on 3 September 2016 and finished on 13 May 2017. Leith Athletic were the defending champions.

The league was reduced to a 12-team division following the departure of Civil Service Strollers and Hawick Royal Albert who left to join the Lowland Football League, Craigroyston who left to join the Scottish Junior Football Association and Spartans Reserves who withdrew.

Tweedmouth Rangers joined from the North Northumberland League, however Duns resigned before the season began.

Teams

The following teams have changed division since the 2015–16 season.

To East of Scotland Football League
Transferred  from North Northumberland Football League
 Tweedmouth Rangers

From East of Scotland Football League
Transferred to Lowland Football League
 Civil Service Strollers
 Hawick Royal Albert

Transferred to East South Division
 Craigroyston

League table

References

East